Asta Nørregaard (13 August 1853 – 23 March 1933) was a Norwegian painter who is best known for her portraits.

Biography

Nørregaard was born in Christiania (now Oslo), Norway. She was the daughter of Hans Peter Nørregaard (1818–1872) and Elise Jacobine Hesselberg (1821–1853). She and an older sister were orphaned early and both remained unmarried. Asta Nørregaard received her early education at the  Knud Bergslien painting school together with Harriet Backer. She was a pupil of Eilif Peterssen in Munich from 1875 to 1878. She studied in Paris during 1879. Nørregaard held solo exhibitions at Blomqvist Kunsthandel in 1893, 1903, 1913 and 1925. She was also a frequent exhibitor at group exhibitions: Salon de Paris in 1881 and 1882, and world exhibitions in Antwerp in 1885 and Paris 1889. She received the King's Medal of Merit in gold in 1920. Her work is exhibited at the Munch Museum, Oslo City Museum, University of Oslo and National Gallery in Oslo.
 Nørregaard was included in the 2018 exhibit Women in Paris 1850-1900.

Selected works
 Paul Breder, 1879
 Anette Birch 1882
 L'attente de Christ 1881
 Maggie Plahte, 1881
 Maggie reiseklar, 1881
 Asta Norregaard Fransk kjokkeninterior, 1881
 Villiers-le-Bel, 1881
 Carl Paul Caspari, 1885
 Edvard Munch, 1885
 Gisle Johnson, 1885
 Musikkinteriør, 1885
 Bondekone fra Normandie, ca. 1887–89
 Angelo, 1888
 Lesende dame ved vindu, 1888
 Midnattsmesse i et fransk kloster, 1888–89
 Elisabeth Fearnley, 1892
 Martine Cappelen Hjort, 1897
 Dagny Kiær, 1899
 Niels August Andresen Butenschøn, 1900
 Marie Andresen Butenschøn, 1904
 Harald Løvenskiold, 1905

Portraits

References 

1853 births
1933 deaths
Artists from Oslo
19th-century Norwegian painters
20th-century Norwegian painters
Norwegian women painters
19th-century Norwegian women artists
20th-century Norwegian women artists
Recipients of the King's Medal of Merit in gold